The Hot R&B/Hip-Hop Songs chart ranks the most popular R&B and hip hop songs in the United States and is published weekly by Billboard. Rankings are based on a measure of radio airplay, sales data, and streaming activity. The chart had 100 positions but was shortened to 50 positions in October 2012.

The chart is used to track the success of popular music songs in urban, or primarily African American, venues. Dominated over the years at various times by jazz, rhythm and blues, doo-wop, rock and roll, soul, and funk, it is today dominated by contemporary R&B and hip hop. Since its inception, the chart has changed its name many times in order to accurately reflect the industry at the time.

History
Beginning in 1942, Billboard published a chart of bestselling black music, first as the Harlem Hit Parade, then as Race Records. Then in 1949, Billboard began publishing a Rhythm and Blues chart, which entered "R&B" into mainstream lexicon. These three charts were consolidated into a single Hot R&B Singles chart in October 1958.

From November 30, 1963, to January 23, 1965, there were no Billboard R&B singles charts. The "Hot R&B Singles" chart was discontinued when Billboard determined it unnecessary due to so much crossover of titles between the R&B and pop charts in light of the rise of Motown. The chart was reinstated as Hot Rhythm & Blues Singles on January 30, 1965.

Beginning August 23, 1969, the rhythm and blues was replaced in favor of "soul", and the chart was renamed to Best Selling Soul Singles. The move was made by a Billboard editorial decision that the term "soul" more accurately accounted for the "broad range of song and instrumental material which derives from the musical genius of the black American". In late June 1982, the chart was renamed again, this time to Hot Black Singles because the music that African-Americans were buying and listening to had a "greater stylistic variety than the soul sound" of the early 1970s. Black Singles was deemed an acceptable term to encompass pop, funk, and early rap music popular in urban communities.

Beginning October 27, 1990, the Hot Black Singles chart was returned to the Hot R&B Singles name first used in 1958. Hip hop was introduced to the chart beginning with the December 11, 1999 issue, when Billboard changed the name to Hot R&B/Hip-Hop Singles & Tracks to recognize the influence and relationship of hip hop to the genre. Within a few years, the crossover of R&B titles onto the pop chart was so significant that all Top Ten songs on the Billboard Hot 100 chart on October 11, 2003, were by black artists. The lengthy title was shortened to "Hot R&B/Hip-Hop Songs" on April 30, 2005. 

The chart's methodology was changed starting with the October 20, 2012 issue, to match the Billboard Hot 100's---incorporating digital downloads and video streaming data (R&B/Hip-Hop Digital Songs) and combining it with airplay of R&B and hip-hop songs across all radio formats, to determine song position. Also at this time, the chart was shortened to 50 positions.

Significant song achievements

Most weeks at number one

20 weeks
 "Old Town Road" (2019) – Lil Nas X featuring Billy Ray Cyrus

18 weeks
"The Honeydripper (Parts 1 & 2)" (1945) – Joe Liggins and His Honeydrippers
"Choo Choo Ch'Boogie" (1946) – Louis Jordan and His Tympany Five
"One Dance" (2016) – Drake featuring Wizkid and Kyla
"Industry Baby" (2021–22) - Lil Nas X featuring Jack Harlow

17 weeks
"Ain't Nobody Here but Us Chickens" (1947) – Louis Jordan and His Tympany Five

16 weeks
"Hey! Ba-Ba-Re-Bop" (1946) – Lionel Hampton and His Orchestra
"Blurred Lines" (2013) – Robin Thicke featuring T.I. and Pharrell Williams

15 weeks
"Trouble Blues" (1949) – The Charles Brown Trio
"Be Without You" (2006) – Mary J. Blige

14 weeks
"Don't Cry Baby" (1943) – Erskine Hawkins and His Orchestra
"Boogie Woogie Blue Plate" (1947) – Louis Jordan and His Tympany Five
"The Huckle-Buck" (1949) – Paul Williams and His Hucklebucklers
 "Black Night" (1951) – Charles Brown
"Sixty Minute Man" (1951) – The Dominoes
"The Things That I Used to Do" (1954) – Guitar Slim
"Nobody's Supposed to Be Here" (1998–99) – Deborah Cox
"We Belong Together" (2005) – Mariah Carey
"Blame It" (2009) – Jamie Foxx featuring T-Pain
"Pretty Wings" (2009) – Maxwell
"Diamonds" (2012–2013) – Rihanna
"Thrift Shop" (2013) – Macklemore & Ryan Lewis featuring Wanz
"See You Again" (2015) – Wiz Khalifa featuring Charlie Puth
"Rockstar" (2017–18) – Post Malone featuring 21 Savage

13 weeks
"Pink Champagne" (1950) – Joe Liggins and His Honeydrippers
"Honky Tonk (Parts 1 & 2)" (1956) – Bill Doggett
"Can't Be Friends" (2010–2011) – Trey Songz
"The Monster" (2013–14) – Eminem featuring Rihanna
"Fancy" (2014) – Iggy Azalea featuring Charli XCX

12 weeks
"(Opportunity Knocks But Once) Snatch and Grab It" (1947) – Julia Lee and Her Boy Friends
"Saturday Night Fish Fry" (1949) – Louis Jordan and His Tympany Five
"Searchin'" (1957) – The Coasters
"Bump n' Grind" (1994) – R. Kelly
"Single Ladies (Put a Ring on It)" (2008–09) – Beyoncé
"Un-Thinkable (I'm Ready)" (2010) – Alicia Keys
"Happy" (2014) – Pharrell Williams
"Blinding Lights" (2021) – The Weeknd

Songs with most weeks on the chart
 75 weeks – "Be Without You" – Mary J. Blige (2005)
 74 weeks – "God In Me" – Mary Mary (2009)
 73 weeks – "On the Ocean" – K'Jon (2009)
 71 weeks – 
"You Make Me Wanna..." – Usher (1997)
"There Goes My Baby" – Usher (2010) 
 70 weeks – "Step in the Name of Love" – R. Kelly (2003)
 66 weeks –
"Blinding Lights" - The Weeknd (2020)
 63 weeks –
"In My Bed" – Dru Hill (1997)
 60 weeks – "Too Close" – Next (1997)
 59 weeks – 
"Pretty Wings" – Maxwell (2009)
"Un-Thinkable (I'm Ready)" – Alicia Keys (2010)
"Sure Thing" – Miguel (2011)
 58 weeks – 
"When I See U" – Fantasia (2007)
"Teachme" – Musiq Soulchild (2007)
"Love on Top" – Beyoncé (2011)
 56 weeks – 
"If I Ain't Got You" – Alicia Keys (2004) 
"Lost Without U" – Robin Thicke (2007) 
"Until the End of Time" – Justin Timberlake & Beyoncé (2008) 
 55 weeks – 
"Heaven Sent" – Keyshia Cole (2008) 
"Spotlight" – Jennifer Hudson (2008)
"Drank in My Cup" – Kirko Bangz (2011)
"Adorn" – Miguel (2012)
 54 weeks – 
"Stay" – Tyrese (2011) 
"Thrift Shop" – Macklemore & Ryan Lewis feat. Wanz (2012) 
 52 weeks – 
"We Belong Together" – Mariah Carey (2005)
"Up!" – LoveRance feat. Iamsu & Skipper or 50 Cent (2011)
"Thinkin Bout You" – Frank Ocean (2013) 
"Can't Hold Us" – Macklemore & Ryan Lewis feat. Ray Dalton (2013)
"All of Me" – John Legend (2014)

Longest climbs to number one
43rd week – "Step in the Name of Love" by R. Kelly
35th week – "All of Me" by John Legend
32nd week – "Needed Me" by Rihanna
Source:

Significant artist achievements

Most number-one singles
The artists with the most No. 1 hits on the Hot R&B/Hip-Hop Songs chart since October 1958.

Artists with most weeks at number one on the chart

† Pre-October 1958 charts.

Most top 10 singles

Most chart entries

Most entries on chart since October 1958.

Self-replacement at number one
 Dinah Washington, July 25, 1960: "A Rockin' Good Way (to Mess Around and Fall in Love)" with Brook Benton replaced by "This Bitter Earth" 
 Freddie Jackson, November 15, 1986: "A Little Bit More" with Melba Moore replaced by "Tasty Love"
 Nelly, August 24, 2002: "Hot in Herre" replaced by "Dilemma" featuring Kelly Rowland 
 Jay-Z, August 16, 2003: "Crazy in Love" (Beyoncé featuring Jay-Z) replaced by "Frontin'" (Pharrell featuring Jay-Z) 
 50 Cent, April 16, 2005: "Candy Shop" featuring Olivia replaced by "Hate It or Love It" (The Game featuring 50 Cent) 
 Alicia Keys, January 5, 2008: "No One" replaced by "Like You'll Never See Me Again" 
 Drake, February 26, 2011: "Fall for Your Type" (Jamie Foxx featuring Drake) replaced by "Moment 4 Life" (Nicki Minaj featuring Drake) 
 Lil Wayne, July 26, 2011: "Motivation" (Kelly Rowland featuring Lil Wayne) replaced by "I'm on One" (DJ Khaled featuring Drake, Rick Ross, and Lil Wayne)
 Drake, February 25, 2012: "Make Me Proud" featuring Nicki Minaj replaced by "The Motto" featuring Lil Wayne 
 2 Chainz, August 18, 2012: "Mercy" with Kanye West, Big Sean, and Pusha T replaced by "No Lie" featuring Drake 
 Macklemore & Ryan Lewis, May 4, 2013: "Thrift Shop" featuring Wanz replaced by "Can't Hold Us" featuring Ray Dalton 
 The Weeknd, October 3, 2015: "Can't Feel My Face" replaced by "The Hills" 
 Drake, Feb. 20, 2016: “Work” (Rihanna featuring Drake) replaced by "Summer Sixteen"
 DJ Khaled, July 29, 2017: "I'm the One" featuring Justin Bieber, Quavo, Chance the Rapper, and Lil Wayne replaced by "Wild Thoughts" featuring Rihanna and Bryson Tiller 
 Drake, April 21, 2018: "God’s Plan" replaced by "Nice for What" 
 Drake, July 21, 2018: "Nice for What" replaced by "In My Feelings" 
 Travis Scott, November 3, 2018: "Zeze" (Kodak Black featuring Travis Scott and Offset) replaced by "Sicko Mode"
 Post Malone, April 6, 2019: "Sunflower (Spider-Man: Into the Spider Verse)", with Swae Lee replaced by "Wow"
 Lizzo, November 23, 2019: "Truth Hurts" replaced by "Good as Hell"

Source:

Bubbling Under R&B/Hip-Hop Songs
Bubbling Under R&B/Hip-Hop Songs was a chart composed of 25 positions that represented songs making progress to chart on the main R&B/Hip-Hop Songs chart. Many times, songs halted their progress at this chart and never debuted on the Hot R&B/Hip-Hop Songs chart. The Bubbling Under R&B/Hip-Hop Songs chart could have also been seen as a 25 position quasi-addendum to the chart, since the chart represented the 25 songs below position number 50 that had not previously appeared on the main chart.

See also
List of number-one rhythm and blues hits (United States)
Rhythm and blues
Hip-hop music
Hot R&B/Hip-Hop Airplay

References
Works cited
 
 

Notes

External links
Current Billboard Hot R&B/Hip-Hop Songs chart

Billboard charts